The Boulevard du Montparnasse is a two-way boulevard in Montparnasse, in the 6th, 14th and 15th arrondissements in Paris.

Situation

The boulevard joins the place Léon Paul Fargue and place Camille Jullian. The Tour Montparnasse and place du 18 juin 1940 also found along it.

See also 

Cimetière du Montparnasse
Gare Montparnasse

Montparnasse
Montparnasse
Montparnasse
Montparnasse